This is a list of events and openings related to amusement parks that have occurred in 2012. These various lists are not exhaustive.

Amusement parks

Opening

 United States Aquatica San Antonio – May 19, replaced the former Lost Lagoon water park.
 United States Galveston Island Historic Pleasure Pier – Summer
 People's Republic of China Happy Valley, Wuhan – April 29
 Malaysia Legoland Malaysia – September 15

Change of name
 Alabama Adventure » Splash Adventure
 The Great Escape & Splashwater Kingdom » Great Escape
 Boomerang Bay » Soak City
 Disney's California Adventure » Disney California Adventure

Change of ownership
 Alabama Adventure – Adrenaline Family Entertainment » General Attractions LLC
 The Beach – Unknown » Adventure Holdings LLC
 Knott's Soak City (San Diego) – Cedar Fair Entertainment Company » SeaWorld Parks & Entertainment

Birthday

 United States Adventureland (New York) - 50th birthday
 England Chessington World of Adventures – 25th birthday
 France Disneyland Paris – 20th birthday
 Netherlands Efteling – 60th birthday
 United States Epcot – 30th birthday
 France Futuroscope – 25th birthday
 United States Kings Island – 40th birthday
 Canada La Ronde – 45th birthday
 Australia Luna Park, Melbourne – Centenary celebration (100th birthday)
 Italy Mirabilandia – 20th birthday
 People's Republic of China Ocean Park Hong Kong – 35th birthday
 United States Six Flags Fiesta Texas – 20th birthday
 United States Six Flags Over Georgia – 45th birthday
 France Walt Disney Studios Park – 10th birthday

Closed
 Camelot Theme Park - September 2
 Dash n Splash
 Le Bioscope - September 30

Additions

Roller coasters

New

Relocated

Refurbished

Other attractions

New

Closed attractions & roller coasters

Themed Accommodation

New

Amusement parks in terms of attendance

Worldwide
This section list the top 25 largest amusement parks worldwide in order of annual attendance in 2012.

Poll rankings

Golden Ticket Awards

The 2012 Amusement Today Golden Ticket Awards were held at Dollywood in Pigeon Forge, Tennessee.

Best Roller Coaster Poll
Mitch Hawker's Best Roller Coaster Poll is yet to be held for 2012.

Records broken

See also
 List of roller coaster rankings
 :Category:Amusement rides introduced in 2012
 :Category:Roller coasters introduced in 2012
 :Category:Amusement rides that closed in 2012

Notes

References

External links
 Listing of 2012 roller coaster openings at the Roller Coaster DataBase
 Listing of 2012 roller coaster closures at the Roller Coaster DataBase

Amusement parks by year
Amusement parks